Darmaran-e Sofla (also Romanized as Darmarān-e Soflá) is a village in Qalkhani Rural District, Gahvareh District, Dalahu County, Kermanshah Province, Iran. At the 2006 census, its population was 161, in 33 families.

References 

Populated places in Dalahu County